Vladan Pavlović (born 24 February 1984) is a Serbian football coach and a former defender. He is an assistant coach for Radnik Surdulica.

He was born in Surdulica and he played for FK Obilić, FK Rad and FK Bežanija, before moving to FK Vojvodina. In the 2009–10 he was loaned to FK Javor.

External links
Profile and stats at Srbijafudbal.
FK Vojvodina official site 
Vladan Pavlović Stats at Utakmica.rs

1984 births
Living people
People from Surdulica
Serbian footballers
FK Obilić players
FK Vojvodina players
FK Rad players
FK Bežanija players
FK Javor Ivanjica players
FK Radnički Niš players
FK Radnik Surdulica players
Serbian SuperLiga players
Association football defenders
Serbian football managers